Kutumba is an instrumental folk Nepalese band. It only uses Nepalese traditional musical instruments such as bamboo flutes, sarangi, madal, tungna, dhol, jhyamta, arbajoo, dhime, dhyangro, damphu, khin, and singing bowl. The band recorded a single for season 6 of Coke Studio Pakistan, which aired in late 2013. They have collaborated with other Nepali artists such as Navneet Aditya Waiba, Satya Aditya Waiba, Albatross, Hari Maharjan, 1974 AD and Astha Tamang Maskey. They competed in the AI Song Contest 2021 alongside Diwas, Chepang, and Hari Maharjan with the song "Dreaming of Nepal", placing 17th with 15 points.

Discography
Forever Nepali Folk Instrumental (2004)
Folk Roots (2005)
Naulo Bihani (2006)
Mithila (2009)
Utsarga (2010)
Karmath (2013)
Himalayan Highlands (2017)

Personnel
Tungna and Arbajo: Arun Manandhar
Sarangi: Kiran Nepali
Percussion: Pavit Maharjan
Percussion: Raju Maharjan
Flute: Rubin Kumar Shrestha
Effects: Siddhartha Maharjan
Manager/ Technical Coordinator: Arun Gurung 
Stage/ Line Manager: Niraj Maharjan

See also 

 Navneet Aditya Waiba
 Nepathya
 1974 AD

References

External links

https://web.archive.org/web/20130112031557/http://www.subsonicroutes.com/events/kutumba-live-in-london/
http://www.kathmanduarts.org/Kathmandu_Arts/12_09-Kutumba.html
https://web.archive.org/web/20130127095331/http://www.sarvodayausa.org/news/kutumba/
https://web.archive.org/web/20130113035321/http://www.ekantipur.com/en/related-news/kutumba-31575.html
http://www.nepalunderground.com/kutumba-everlasting-nepali-folk-instrumental-2005-songs/

Nepalese musical groups
2004 establishments in Nepal
Musical groups from Kathmandu